Haunted History may refer to:

Haunted History (1998 TV series)
Haunted History (2013 TV series)